Roberta Rodeghiero (born 7 April 1990) is an Italian figure skater. She is the 2015 Trophee Eric Bompard bronze medalist, the 2014 CS Ondrej Nepela Trophy champion, the 2015 Lombardia Trophy champion, the 2012 Crystal Skate of Romania champion, the 2012 Egna Spring Trophy champion, and a three-time Italian national silver medalist (2015-2017).

She has competed in the final segment at six ISU Championships.

Personal life
Roberta Rodeghiero was born on 7 April 1990 in Schio, Italy. As of January 2015, she was studying literature and languages at university.

Career

Early years 
Rodeghiero began learning to skate in 1998. She debuted on the ISU Junior Grand Prix series in 2005 and continued competing at JGP events through 2008.

Senior career through 2012–2013
Rodeghiero made her senior international debut at the 2009 NRW Trophy. She was sent to the 2011 World Championships in Moscow but was eliminated after the preliminary round.

Her first national medal, bronze, came at the 2012 Italian Championships. She was named in Italy's team to the 2013 European Championships in Zagreb, Croatia but was eliminated after placing 27th in the short program.

2013–2014 to present
Rodeghiero reached the free skate at an ISU Championship for the first time at the 2014 European Championships in Budapest; she ranked 15th in the short program, 9th in the free skate, and 11th overall.

The following season, Rodeghiero placed fourth at the 2014 CS Lombardia Trophy, her ISU Challenger Series debut, and won the 2014 CS Ondrej Nepela Trophy. She finished 8th at the 2015 European Championships in Stockholm and 20th at the 2015 World Championships in Shanghai.

In 2015–2016, Rodeghiero received her first Grand Prix invitations. At the 2015 Trophée Éric Bompard, she placed third in the short program; the International Skating Union deemed it to be the final result after the free skate was canceled due to the November 2015 Paris attacks. She finished 7th at the 2015 Rostelecom Cup.  She later finished fifth at the European championships, her highest placing in that competition.

Rodeghiero had health problems in the 2017–2018 Olympic season. She withdrew from the Italian Championships.

Programs

Competitive highlights 
GP: Grand Prix; CS: Challenger Series; JGP: Junior Grand Prix

References

External links 

 
 Roberta Rodeghiero at Tracings

1990 births
Italian female single skaters
Living people
People from Schio
Competitors at the 2015 Winter Universiade
Competitors at the 2011 Winter Universiade
Competitors at the 2013 Winter Universiade
Competitors at the 2017 Winter Universiade
Sportspeople from the Province of Vicenza
20th-century Italian women
21st-century Italian women